Viimne linn is a historical novel by Estonian author Karl Ristikivi. It was first published in 1962 in Lund, Sweden by Eesti Kirjanike Kooperatiiv (Estonian Writers' Cooperative). In Estonia it was published in 1990.

1962 novels
Novels by Karl Ristikivi
Acre, Israel in fiction